Calochone acuminata is a species of flowering plant in the family Rubiaceae. It is found in Cabinda Province, Cameroon, and Gabon. Its natural habitat is subtropical or tropical moist lowland forests. It is threatened by habitat loss.

References

acuminata
Flora of Cabinda Province
Flora of Cameroon
Flora of Gabon
Vulnerable plants
Taxonomy articles created by Polbot
Taxa named by Ronald William John Keay